is a Japanese engineering, procurement and construction company serving mainly the hydrocarbons (oil and natural gas) and petrochemical sectors worldwide.

It was established in 1961. Its various business include R&D collaboration, design, engineering, equipment procurement, construction, test operations and technical guidance in such areas as general chemicals, petrochemicals, oil refinement, natural gas, electric power, nuclear power, advanced production systems, distribution, medical facilities, biotechnology, environment at each manufacturing plant, procurement, development and sales of systems engineering and other software.

Most of its revenue comes from outside Japan; it has a particular presence in China, India, Indonesia, Iran and Russia. In the fiscal year ending March 31, 2008, it had sales of 215 billion yen, a net income of 4.45 billion yen, and about a thousand employees.

The Toyo Group, or Global Toyo, consists of Toyo together with 27 subsidiaries and 11 affiliates, with a total of 5500 employees; the central portion comprises about 3300 employees.

References

Engineering companies of Japan
Mitsui
1961 establishments in Japan
Companies listed on the Tokyo Stock Exchange
Companies based in Chiba Prefecture
Construction and civil engineering companies based in Tokyo
Construction and civil engineering companies established in 1961
Japanese companies established in 1961